You Deliver Me is Selah's seventh studio album. It features a cover of Hillsong Worship's "Hosanna". The album was released August 25, 2009.

Critical reception

Andree Farias of AllMusic concludes his review with, "Selah is perhaps the only unoriginal true original left in Christian music, a group that sticks to its classic guns while everyone else chases the latest flavor of the moment."

Dale Lewis reviews the album for TitleTrakk and begins, "Selah, best known for their contemporary hit "You Raise Me Up," returns with a very personal and poignant album in You Deliver Me."

Suzie Brock of Cross Rhythms gives the album 8 out of a possible 10 and writes, "Throughout the whole album the standard of the lead vocals and harmonies is very high, with every song being touching in a different way. Piano is featured heavily in the arrangements which are refreshingly contemporary. Selah's personnel have changed considerably down the years but they retain a slick professionalism and a winning way of mixing old hymns and new material."

Track listing

Track information and credits verified from the album's liner notes.

Personnel 
Selah
 Allan Hall – backing vocals (1-9, 11, 12, 14), acoustic piano (1, 2, 3, 5, 6, 7, 9-15), arrangements (1, 2, 3, 5, 6, 7, 9-15), lead vocals (14)
 Amy Perry – lead vocals (1, 2, 3, 5, 6, 8, 9, 11, 12, 14, 15), backing vocals (1-9, 11, 12, 14)
 Todd Smith – lead vocals (1-7, 9-14), backing vocals (1-12, 14, 15), arrangements (1, 2, 3, 5, 6, 7, 9-15)

Musicians
 Jason Kyle – arrangements (1, 2, 3, 5, 6, 7, 9-15), additional keyboards (3), additional backing vocals (11)
 Tim Lauer – accordion (2, 7, 12, 14)
 Charlie Judge – keyboards (3), Hammond B3 organ (3), programming (3), strings (3)
 Bernie Herms – acoustic piano (4, 8), keyboards (4), arrangements (4, 8)
 Gordon Mote – keyboards (7), Hammond B3 organ (11)
 Adam Lester – guitar (4, 8)
 Trevor Morgan – acoustic guitar (4)
 Jakk Kincaid – acoustic guitar (5, 11)
 Aaron Sands – bass guitar (3)
 James Gregory – bass guitar (4)
 Tony Lucido – bass guitar (8)
 Dan Immel – upright bass (11)
 Noah Hungate – drums (3)
 Dan Needham – drums (4, 8)
 Eric Darken – percussion (2, 3, 5, 7, 10)
 Paul Mills – string arrangements (1, 2, 6, 7, 14)
 Jim Gray – string arrangements and conductor (4, 8)
 Carl Gorodetzky – string contractor (4, 8)
 David Angell – strings (1, 2, 6, 7, 14)
 Monisa Angell – strings (1, 2, 6, 7, 14)
 Carolyn Bailey – strings (1, 6)
 David Davidson – strings (1, 2, 6, 7, 14), violin solo (14)
 Conni Ellisor – strings (1, 6)
 Anthony LaMarchina – strings (1, 6)
 John Catchings – strings (2, 6, 7, 14), cello (12, 14)
 Jonathan Yudkin – strings (3)
 Jim Grosjean – strings (6)
 Pamela Sixfin – strings (6)
 Alan Umstead – strings (6)
 Catherine Umstead – strings (6)
 The Nashville String Machine – strings (4, 8)
 Nickie Conley – choir vocals (3, 11)
 Louis Cross – choir vocals (3, 11)
 Janet Kenyon – choir vocals (3, 11)
 Jack Smith – lead and backing vocals (10)
 Molly Smith – backing vocals (10)

Production 
 Producers – Allan Hall, Jason Kyle and Todd Smith (Tracks 1, 2, 3, 5, 6, 7 & 9-15); Bernie Herms (Tracks 4 & 8).
 A&R – John Ozier and Bryan Stewart 
 Engineers – Joe Baldridge, Danny Duncan, Bernie Herms, Jason Kyle and Bill Whittington.
 String Engineers – Daewoo Kim and Brent King 
 Assistant Engineers – Travis Brigman, Matt Coles and Lowell Reynolds.
 Drum Editing on Track 3 – Joshua Keith
 Mixed by Jason Kyle 
 Mastered by Doug Sax and Sangwook Nam at The Mastering Lab (Ojai, CA).
 Art Direction and Design – Lee Wright 
 Photography – Reid Rolls

Charts

Awards

In 2010, the album was nominated for a Dove Award for Inspirational Album of the Year at the 41st GMA Dove Awards.

The song "Hosanna" was nominated for Inspirational Recorded Song of the Year as well as the Worship Song of the Year at the 41st GMA Dove Awards.

References

2009 albums
Selah (band) albums
Curb Records albums
Word Records albums